The Fort Rosalie or Fort class of fleet replenishment vessel of the British Royal Fleet Auxiliary were designed to replenish Royal Navy taskgroups with various armaments and victualling stores while under way. Unlike the bigger , they supply dry stores and not fuel. RFA Fort Rosalie was originally known as Fort Grange but was renamed in 2000 to avoid confusion with the new Fort Victoria-class replenishment oiler . Both ships were withdrawn from service and later sold in 2021.

Design
They have the capacity to store  of stores, including refrigerated items, in four holds. They are capable of replenishment at sea (RAS), using three 10-ton and three 5-ton cranes and vertical replenishment (VERTREP). For the latter role there are generous flight facilities; a single spot flight deck, an emergency landing platform atop the hangar and a complement of up to four (but usually one) Fleet Air Arm Westland Sea King helicopters and the requisite maintenance facilities. As such, they are often used for aviation training.

History
Two ships were ordered in 1971, with the first entering service in 1978. Both ships saw service in the Falklands War, the then Fort Grange being shadowed by Argentine Air Force C-130 Hercules aircraft while still  from the combat area and Fort Austin being attacked while sitting in San Carlos Water. Fort Austin supported the British intervention in Sierra Leone in 2000.

Both Fort Rosalie and Fort Austin have had major refits at Cammell Laird to enable another decade of service. In 2011 it was announced that the service lives of Fort Austin and Fort Rosalie would be extended by another two years to 2023 and 2024 respectively. They will ultimately be replaced by the new Solid Support Ships.

As of June 2020, both ships were reported to be in either reduced (base maintenance period) or extended readiness (unmanned reserve) with replenishment rigs not compatible with the s.

The 2021 defence white paper announced that both ships of the class would be decommissioned and eventually replaced by new Fleet Solid Stores Support Vessels. In May 2021, both ships were put up for sale to be scrapped. The notice for recycling was subsequently withdrawn, and in October 2021 it was announced by the Defence Equipment Sales Authority and Defence Equipment and Support that both ships of the class had been sold to the Egyptian Navy, with refurbishment work expected to be undertaken by Cammell Laird prior to their export. While awaiting their refit, it was reported that Fort Austin would be renamed ENS Luxor and Fort Rosalie would be renamed ENS Abu Simbel.

Ships

References

Further reading
 

 

Auxiliary replenishment ship classes